George Singleton is a Southern author who has written eight collections of short stories, two novels, and an instructional book on writing fiction. He was born in Anaheim, California and raised in Greenwood, South Carolina. Singleton graduated from Furman University in 1980 with a degree in Philosophy and an inductee into Phi Beta Kappa. He also holds an MFA degree from the University of North Carolina at Greensboro. Singleton was the longstanding teacher of fiction writing and editing at the South Carolina Governor's School For The Arts & Humanities in Greenville, SC. In 2009, Singleton was a Guggenheim Fellow, and in 2011 he was awarded the Hillsdale Award for Fiction by The Fellowship of Southern Writers. In 2013, Singleton accepted the John C. Cobb Endowed Chair in the Humanities at Wofford College where he currently teaches. Singleton was inducted into the Fellowship of Southern Writers in April 2015, and was awarded the John William Corrington Award for Literary Excellence in 2016.

Works

Fiction

Short Story Collections
 These People Are Us: Stories (2001)
 The Half-Mammals of Dixie (2002)
 Why Dogs Chase Cars: Tales of a Beleaguered Boyhood (2004)
 Drowning in Gruel (2006)
Stray Decorum (2012) 
Between Wrecks (2014) 
Calloustown (2015) 
Staff Picks (2019) 
’’You Want More’’ (2020)

Novels
 Novel (2005)
 Work Shirts For Madmen (2007)

Nonfiction

Pep Talks, Warnings, And Screeds: Indispensable Wisdom And Cautionary Advice For Writers (2008)

References

External links
 Interview with George Singleton

Writers from South Carolina
Furman University alumni
Living people
People from Greenwood, South Carolina
University of North Carolina at Greensboro alumni
University of North Carolina at Wilmington faculty
University of South Carolina faculty
People from Anaheim, California
Writers from California
1958 births
American male writers